Neolissochilus hexastichus is a species of cyprinid in the genus Neolissochilus. It inhabits Southeast Asia and is considered "near threatened" by the IUCN.

References

Cyprinidae
Cyprinid fish of Asia